Hamar Bhauji is Bhojpuri film released in 1983 directed by Kalpataru.

References

External links

1980s Bhojpuri-language films